Lev is a tiny lunar crater located in the southeast part of the Mare Crisium in the east of the lunar near side. The crater is located between the larger crater Fahrenheit to the northwest and the wrinkle ridge Dorsa Harker to the southeast. The name Lev does not refer to a specific person; it is a Russian male given name. Northwest of the crater was the Luna 24 landing site.

Location

References

External links

Lev at The Moon Wiki
Mare Crisium: Failure Then Success - Lunar Reconnaissance Orbiter page
 

Impact craters on the Moon